The Laister-Kauffmann TG-4 (designated LK-10 Yankee Doodle 2 by its designer) was a sailplane produced in the United States during the Second World War for training cargo glider pilots. It was a conventional sailplane design with a fuselage of steel tube construction and wooden wings and tail, covered all over with fabric. The pilot and instructor sat in tandem under a long canopy.

Design and development
Jack Laister designed the aircraft in response to the formation of the United States Army Air Corps' American Glider Program in 1941, basing it on his Yankee Doodle design of 1938 for Lawrence Tech. Aside from the addition of a second seat, the Yankee Doodle 2 differed from its predecessor by having wings of constant dihedral instead of gull wings. The USAAC expressed interest, but only if Laister could arrange for the manufacture of the type. When Laister found a sponsor in businessman John Kauffmann, they established the Laister-Kauffmann Corporation in St Louis, Missouri and the USAAC ordered three prototypes as the XTG-4.

When evaluation of the type proved positive, the Army placed an order for 75 aircraft, followed by an order for another 75. These were operated as the TG-4A. All had been withdrawn from service prior to the end of the war when it was discovered that the flight characteristics of the aircraft were so different to those of a cargo glider, that the experience gained on the TG-4 was not particularly relevant. After the war many were sold as surplus and helped build civilian gliding in the USA.

Variants
 XTG-4 - prototypes (three built)
 TG-4A - production model (150 built)
 TG-4B - civilian aircraft impressed into service (one impressed)

Operators

LK-10 Serial #48 registered as N53619 owned and flown by Doug Fronius of Poway, California, USA as of 2023. Based at Mountain Valley Airport in Tehachapi, California.

LK-10 Serial #106 under prefix PT-PAZ operated by Aeroclube de Bauru in Brazil as of April 2013
 This glider crashed on March 10, 2020.

LK-10 Serial # unk operating at Rockton, Ontario (CF-AZJ) as of Apr, 2022

Aircraft on display
 42-43688 – TG-4A on static display at the Planes of Fame in Chino, California.
 42‐43734 – TG-4A on static display at the National Museum of the United States Air Force in Dayton, Ohio.
 42-43740 – TG-4A on static display at the Museum of Aviation at Warner Robins Air Force Base in Warner Robins, Georgia.
 42-53078 – TG-4A on static display at the Air Mobility Command Museum at Dover Air Force Base near Dover, Delaware.
 42-437357 – TG-4A on static display at the National Soaring Museum in Elmira, New York.
 42-530727 – TG-4A on static display at the Silent Wings Museum in Lubbock, Texas.
 28 – TG-4A on static display at the US Southwest Soaring Museum in Moriarty, New Mexico.
 71 – TG-4A on static display at the Southern Museum of Flight in Birmingham, Alabama.
 42-53072 – TG-4A on static display at the Military Aviation Museum in Virginia Beach, Virginia.
 LK-10A on static display at the Historic Aircraft Restoration Museum in Maryland Heights, Missouri.
 LK-10A on static display at the Port Townsend Aero Museum in Port Townsend, Washington.
 USAAF 84.42-53027 at Gliding Heritage Centre

Specifications (LK-10 / TG-4A)

See also

Notes

References

Further reading
 
  (uncorrected OCR)

External links

 Laister-Kauffmann TG-4A – National Museum of the United States Air Force
 Sailplane Directory entry on the LK-10
 LTU timeline
 Air Mobility Command museum
 Aircraft/laister-kauffman_tg-4a.htm Museum of Aviation
 The Air Mobility Command Museum

1940s United States sailplanes
Glider aircraft
TG-04